Alain Penz (born 30 October 1947 in Sallanches) is a French former alpine skier.

Career
He competed in the 1968 Winter Olympics and 1972 Winter Olympics. He was the world no. 1 amateur slalom skier. He competed on the French team for the slalom World Cup, tying twice.

References

External links
 
 

1947 births
Living people
French male alpine skiers
Olympic alpine skiers of France
Alpine skiers at the 1968 Winter Olympics
Alpine skiers at the 1972 Winter Olympics
FIS Alpine Ski World Cup champions
Sportspeople from Haute-Savoie